"I'm Alive" is a song recorded by Canadian recording artist Celine Dion for her seventh English-language album, A New Day Has Come (2002). It was released as the album's second single on 9 August 2002 and was also featured in the film Stuart Little 2. The song was written and produced by Kristian Lundin and Andreas Carlsson, who already worked with Dion in 1999 on "That's the Way It Is".

"I'm Alive" is an uplifting midtempo song, where Celine declares she is alive, fulfilled as a mother, and "in love." The music video was directed by Dave Meyers between 24–25 May 2002 and premiered in June 2002. There were two versions made: with or without the Stuart Little 2 movie scenes. "I'm Alive" became a worldwide hit, reaching the top ten in many countries. It was certified platinum in Belgium and gold in France, Denmark, the United Kingdom and Germany.

Background and release
While working on the album, Celine commented; 

"I'm Alive" was released as the album's second single on 12 August 2002. For radio release, the song was re-worked by Humberto Gatica. Epic Records moved forward with the "Humberto Gatica" version as the main version. His version was released on the Stuart Little 2 soundtrack as well as promotional and commercial CD singles.

Although in October 2008 the album version of "I'm Alive" was included on My Love: Essential Collection, the new remix by Laurent Wolf was released to promote it in France. In January 2009, further promotional remixes were made by Maurice Joshua for U.S. clubs.

Composition

"I'm Alive" was written by Kristian Lundin and Andreas Carlsson and produced by Lundin. They worked with Celine before writing her 1999 hit "That's the Way It Is." It is an uplifting midtempo song, where Celine declares she is alive, fulfilled as a mother, and "in love."

The song is written in the key of E major with a moderate tempo of 104 beats per minute.  Dion's vocals span from A3 to D5 in the song. At the two-and-three-quarter minute mark, the song modulates up a whole-step higher to the key of F Major.

Critical reception
While reviewing the Stuart Little 2 soundtrack, William Ruhlmann of AllMusic wrote that "Celine Dion occupies the position taken by Trisha Yearwood on the soundtrack to Stuart Little in 1999, singing an upbeat rhythm number." Another editor, Stephen Thomas Erlewine called the song uplifting and highlighted it; in his review for album he called the song a "hitworthy uptempo gem". ABC's RollerCoaster review was positive, commenting that "this is the type of music you play in the background when you're having a good laugh with friends or a nice tea with family. It's the kind of song you sing along to and slowly get wrapped in it." Chuck Taylor from Billboard said that "I'm Alive" demonstrates a stylistic "left turn, with its throbbing tribal rhythms and a loose, sky-grazing vocal from Dion." The "percolating" Humberto Gatica Mix "adds juice" to the album version, while the uptempo Wake Up Mix, with assistance from Ric Wake and Richie Jones, is Dion's most "inspired and festive" remix to date, with Blondie's "Heart of Glass" woven into the beat to "splendid effect". Neal Sky of Pop Dirt named it a "bubblegum-radio-song". Sal Cinquemani of Slant Magazine called it one of "the album's standout tracks", naming it "an uplifting midtempo number." Christopher Smith from TalkAboutPopMusic said that Dion is "full of energy and blasting her way forward with confidence is the order of the day". He added that it "could almost be declared as her signature, biographical anthem, if it were not for all those mega hits of the 90s." Matt Wilson of UK Mix was positive towards the song, stating that "this new offering is actually an uplifting song that will no doubt be a hit single for her. This is one of the best singles to date."

Commercial performance
The song proved to be successful in many European countries. On the Austrian Singles Chart, the song debuted at number 71. The following week, it climbed from number 71 to number 23. In its fourth week, it reached a peak of number five, where it remained for four consecutive weeks. The song spent twenty-two consecutive weeks on the chart. On the Swedish Singles Chart, the song also reached number 5, spending 18 non-consecutive weeks on the chart.

On the Belgium Singles Chart, the song was a success. It debuted at number 18 and on the following week, it climbed to number 3. In its third week, the song peaked at number 2, where it remained for four consecutive weeks. The song spent a total of 17 weeks inside the top ten and 26 weeks on the chart. "I'm Alive" has been certified platinum in 2002 for over 70,000 units shipment of the single. On the French Singles Chart, the song debuted at number 61. The following week, it climbed from number 61 to number 7, its peak position. The song remained at number 7 for four non-consecutive weeks and it stayed 22 weeks on the chart. The song re-entered the French Singles Chart in 2012, for the week 14 April 2012, at number 129, later following to number 179, spending a total of 24 non-consecutive weeks. It was certified gold in 2002 for over 250,000 units shipment of the single.

"I'm Alive" debuted at number 31 on the Australian ARIA Singles Chart. The following week, it peaked at number 30. The song later fell to number 35, and after two weeks descending the charts, it climbed to number 31. On the New Zealand Singles Chart, it debuted at number 44 and its fourth week, the song peaked at number 35. It spent thirteen weeks on the chart.

On the US Adult Contemporary chart, the song peaked at number 6 and spent 26 weeks on the chart. The "2009 remix" entered the Hot Dance Club Play chart at number 48 and peaked at number 35. According to Billboard, the song has garnered over 49.5 million on-demand streams in the US as of November 2019, becoming Dion's ninth most streamed song in the country.

Live performances
Dion performed "I'm Alive" five nights a week during her show A New Day... at Caesars Palace, Las Vegas. It was released on the A New Day... Live in Las Vegas CD in 2004 and Live in Las Vegas - A New Day... DVD in 2007. The song became a part of the Taking Chances Tour set list and was performed by Dion in a new remix version. An acoustic version of the song was added to the setlist to Dion's Las Vegas residency show in 2015, and the original version of the song was performed in the show during the final year of her residency. The song was also performed in her 2017 European tour, her 2018 tour, and the Courage World Tour. Dion performed "I'm Alive" during her BST Hyde Park concert in London on 5 July 2019.

Music video
The music video was directed by Dave Meyers between 24–25 May 2002 and premiered in June 2002. There were two versions made: with or without the Stuart Little 2 film scenes.

Formats and track listings

Australian CD single
"I'm Alive" (Album Version) – 3:30
"I'm Alive" (The Wake Up Mix) – 3:06
"I'm Alive" (Humberto Gatica Mix) – 3:28
"Aun Existe Amor" – 3:52

European CD single
"I'm Alive" (Humberto Gatica Mix) – 3:28
"I'm Alive" (Johnny Rocks Rhythm Radio Edit) – 3:36

European CD maxi-single
"I'm Alive" (Humberto Gatica Mix) – 3:28
"I'm Alive" (Johnny Rocks Rhythm Radio Edit) – 3:36
"Aun Existe Amor" – 3:52
"I'm Alive" (Joe Bermudez Club Mix) – 7:41
"A New Day Has Come" (Video) – 3:28

UK cassette single
"I'm Alive" (Humberto Gatica Mix) – 3:28
"Aun Existe Amor" – 3:52
"I'm Alive" (Johnny Rocks Rhythm Radio Edit) – 3:36

UK CD single
"I'm Alive" (Humberto Gatica Mix) – 3:28
"Aun Existe Amor" – 3:52
"A New Day Has Come" (Video) – 3:28

UK CD single #2
"I'm Alive" (Album Version) – 3:30
"I'm Alive" (Humberto Gatica Mix) – 3:28
"I'm Alive" (Johnny Rocks Rhythm Radio Edit) – 3:36
"I'm Alive" (Joe Bermudez Radio Edit) – 4:25

Remixes

2002 remixes
"I'm Alive" (Humberto Gatica Mix) – 3:28
"I'm Alive" (Joe Bermudez Radio Edit) – 4:25
"I'm Alive" (Joe Bermudez Club Mix) – 7:41
"I'm Alive" (Johnny Rocks Rhythm Radio Edit) – 3:36
"I'm Alive" (Johnny Rocks World Anthem Remix) – 10:47
"I'm Alive" (The Wake Up Mix) – 3:06

2008–2009 remixes
"I'm Alive" (Laurent Wolf Remix) – 3:56
"I'm Alive" (Maurice Joshua Radio Edit) – 3:14
"I'm Alive" (Maurice Joshua Vocal) – 7:41
"I'm Alive" (Maurice Joshua Dub) – 7:41

Credits and personnel
 Performed by – Celine Dion
 Produced by – Ric Wake, Richie Jones and Kristian Lundin
 Additional producer – Richie Jones and Ric Wake
 Additional keyboard programming – Eric Kupper
 Background vocals – Andreas Carlsson and Nana Hedin
 Keyboard, keys programming – Kristian Lundin
 Strings performed by – Stockholm Session Strings
 Additional guitar – Chieli Minucci
 Guitar – Esbjörn Öhrwall
 Additional drum programming – Richie Jones
 Strings conductor – Ulf Janson and Henrik Janson
 Additional keyboard programming – Eric Kupper
 Assistant engineer – Chris Brooke
 Mixing engineer – Mick Guzauski
 Pro Tools engineer – John Amatiello
 Vocal engineer – Humberto Gatica

Charts

Weekly charts

Year-end charts

Certifications and sales

Release history

See also
List of Romanian Top 100 number ones of the 2000s

References

External links

2002 songs
2002 singles
Celine Dion songs
Columbia Records singles
Dance-pop songs
Epic Records singles
Music videos directed by Dave Meyers (director)
Number-one singles in the Czech Republic
Number-one singles in Poland
Number-one singles in Romania
Songs written by Andreas Carlsson
Songs written by Kristian Lundin
Songs written for films